Thomas Jefferson Cowie (February 15, 1857 – July 16, 1936) was a Rear Admiral in the United States Navy whose active-duty career included serving as Navy Paymaster General and Chief of the Bureau of Supplies and Accounts (BuSandA).  Following his retirement, he headed the Navy's Liberty Loans program and was secretary-treasurer of the Navy Mutual Aid Association.

Biography
Cowie was born at Montezuma, Iowa in 1857.

He was commissioned as assistant paymaster from June 16, 1880, rising to the rank of Rear Admiral and the position of Paymaster General and Chief of the Bureau of Supplies and Accounts July 1, 1910.

Rear Admiral Cowie was awarded the Navy Cross for his valuable services in connection with the Liberty Loans of World War I. Retired from the Navy on February 15, 1921, he was ordered to special duty in charge of the Navy Liberty Loan section of the Navy Allotment Office in March 1921, and in June 1923 was ordered to additional duty as secretary-treasurer of the Navy Mutual Aid Association, a position which he held until his death on July 16, 1936 in Washington, D.C. He and his wife Susie A. Cowie (1859–1938) are buried at Arlington National Cemetery.

Namesake
The destroyer  was named in his honor.

Gallery

References

 

1857 births
1936 deaths
Recipients of the Navy Cross (United States)
United States Navy rear admirals
United States Navy personnel of World War I
People from Montezuma, Iowa
Burials at Arlington National Cemetery
Military personnel from Iowa